Sergey Nikolaevich Reformatsky (April 1, 1860 – July 28, 1934) was a Russian chemist.

Life
He was born as a son of a preacher in Borisoglebskoe, near Ivanovo. He studied at the University of Kazan under Alexander Mikhailovich Zaitsev until 1882. He went to Germany for further studies. He joined Victor Meyer at the  University of Heidelberg and Wilhelm Ostwald at the University of Leipzig and finally getting his Ph.D in 1891. The following year he was appointed professor at the University of Kyiv where he stayed the rest of his life.

Work

In 1887 discovered the Reformatsky reaction, during which a zinc organic compound is the key component. 
The use of zinc in organic reactions was common at that time, but it was subsequently replaced by the more convenient magnesium. This was not possible for the reaction of α-chloro acids with ketones, because the magnesium based Grignard reagents are more reactive and lead to other products. This made the Reformatsky reaction a convenient way for the synthesis of β-hydroxy acids which were difficult to obtain with other methods.

References

1860 births
1934 deaths
Taras Shevchenko National University of Kyiv alumni
Russian chemists
Soviet chemists
20th-century chemists
Ukrainian chemists
Russian inventors
Reformatsky
Corresponding Members of the USSR Academy of Sciences